Latifi (also Romanized as Laţīfī) is a city in the Central District of Larestan County, Fars Province, Iran.  At the 2006 census, its population was 5,731, in 1,184 families.

References

Populated places in Larestan County

Cities in Fars Province